The  Koelbjerg Man, formerly known as  Koelbjerg Woman, is the oldest known bog body and also the oldest set of human bones found in Denmark, dated to the time of the Maglemosian culture about 8000 BC. His remains are on display at the Møntergården Museum in Odense, Denmark.

Discovery
In May 1941, a human skull and some bones were discovered near Koelbjerg on the island of Funen. On 21 May, the find was reported to the Fyns Stiftsmuseum. The museum staff were able to reconstruct the original position of the bones only because the blocks of peat containing the bones could be matched to the holes where they were removed from the bog. A thigh bone was found a further  to the southeast.

Study of the remains
The complete skeleton was not found. No signs of disease or malnutrition could be identified on the bones and the preservation of the original full set of teeth also had no pathological signs such as tooth decay. An analysis based on samples from the bones indicated a diet of plants and land-based animals, with little or no seafood. A strontium isotope analysis revealed that he likely grew up in Funen, the island where the remains were found.

An early DNA analysis revealed no useful results. The few DNA traces found were probably from contamination by people handling the remains. Later DNA studies based on samples from the molar teeth revealed in 2016 that the person, long considered a woman, was in fact a man. The sex had occasionally been questioned earlier because of the relatively robust bones.

The distribution of bones over a large area is understandable if the person drowned in the lake: the soft tissues of the corpse may have decayed while floating in open water, allowing disarticulation of the body. The remaining parts sank and were enclosed by lake silt.

In July 1941, a pollen analysis was performed from the inside of the skull. The bog body could be dated to the time of Maglemosian culture about 8000 BC. In October 1943, at the site a bore sample was taken for further investigations. A Carbon 14 test, confirmed in 1983, dated the time of death to the Maglemosian culture.

Koelbjerg Man may have lived in this settlement.

See also
List of unsolved deaths

References

Bibliography

1941 archaeological discoveries
Archaeological discoveries in Denmark
Bog bodies
Forensic palynology